Tom Moran (born August 16, 1932) is a former Canadian football player who played for the Montreal Alouettes and Hamilton Tiger Cats. He previously played for the Brantford Redskins of the Ontario Rugby Football Union. He lives in Houston, Texas.

References

Living people
1932 births
Players of Canadian football from Ontario
Canadian football ends
Montreal Alouettes players
Hamilton Tiger-Cats players
Sportspeople from Hamilton, Ontario